Chapter One is the debut extended play (EP) by English hard rock band Viking Skull. Recorded over the course of two days at Premier Recording Studios in the band's hometown Corby, it was released on 20 October 2003 by Grand Union Recordings. The EP reportedly sold over 10,000 copies in the UK, and was later included as part of the 2010 compilation album Heavy Metal Thunder.

Background
Viking Skull were formed in 2002 by vocalist Roddy Stone, guitarists Frank Regan and Darren Smith, bassist Kevin "Waldie" James and drummer Gordon Morrison after a "drunken jam". Initially intended only to act as the opening band at Raging Speedhorn shows – the band of which Regan, Smith and Morrison were then members (Stone was their guitar technician and Waldie was their merchandising manager) – the group decided to record their own material due to the demand of their crowds.

Chapter One was recorded over the course of just two days at Corby's Premier Recording Studios and self-funded by the band with a budget of approximately £500. All guitars, bass and drums were recorded live, with Stone's vocals overdubbed separately. Upon its release by Grand Union Recordings, the EP received critical acclaim from Metal Hammer magazine, who awarded the release the publication's first 11 out of 10 rating. It reportedly sold over 10,000 copies in the UK.

In 2010, a remastered version of Chapter One was included as part of the compilation album Heavy Metal Thunder, alongside a remastered version of 2005 album Born in Hell and several previously unreleased songs.

Track listing

Personnel
Roddy Stone – vocals
Frank Regan – guitar
Darren Smith – guitar
Kevin "Waldie" James – bass
Gordon Morrison – drums

References

External links

Viking Skull albums
2003 EPs